"Poor Sweet Baby" is a single by American country music artist Jean Shepard.  Released in September 1974, it was the first single from the album Poor Sweet Baby (And Ten Other Bill Anderson Songs).  The song reached #14 on the Billboard Hot Country Singles chart.

Chart performance

References 

1974 singles
Jean Shepard songs
Songs written by Bill Anderson (singer)
Song recordings produced by Larry Butler (producer)
1974 songs
United Artists Records singles